Chrysaster ostensackenella is a moth of the family Gracillariidae. It is known from Ontario, Québec and Nova Scotia in Canada, and the United States (Illinois, Kentucky, New York, Maine, Maryland, Michigan, Vermont, Arizona, Massachusetts, North Carolina and Connecticut). It has also been recorded in 2015 from China and in 2017 from Korea, and in 2022 from Central Italy.

The wingspan is about 5 mm. Adults are brilliantly shiny with an orange forewing marked with transverse silvery-white bands that are narrowly edged with black along their basal margins.

The larvae feed on Robinia species, including Robinia hispida, Robinia neomexicana, Robinia pseudacacia and Robinia viscosa. They mine the leaves of their host plant. The mine has the form of a yellowish blotch mine.  The mine usually occurs on the upperside, but occasionally on the underside, of the leaflet. It is nearly circular in its early stages, but later in development, it becomes irregular in shape.

References

External links
Bug Guide

Lithocolletinae
Taxa named by Asa Fitch
Moths described in 1859
Moths of North America
Lepidoptera of Canada
Lepidoptera of the United States
Leaf miners